The Protectionist Party or Liberal Protectionist Party was an Australian political party, formally organised from 1887 until 1909, with policies centred on protectionism. The party advocated protective tariffs, arguing it would allow Australian industry to grow and provide employment. It had its greatest strength in Victoria and in the rural areas of New South Wales. Its most prominent leaders were Sir Edmund Barton and Alfred Deakin, who were the first and second prime ministers of Australia.

History 

The party was initially centred on New South Wales, where its leaders were George Dibbs and William Lyne. It dominated New South Wales colonial politics before federation. It first contested the 1887 New South Wales election.

On the commencement of the Commonwealth of Australia, Governor-General-designate, The 7th Earl of Hopetoun, appointed Edmund Barton (after the Hopetoun Blunder), leader of the Protectionist Party, to head a caretaker government from 1 January 1901 until the election of a Parliament. At the first federal election in 1901, the Protectionists won 31 of the 75 seats in the House of Representatives. Barton was able to form the Barton minority government with the support of the Labour Party led by Chris Watson, which held the balance of power with 14 seats, on the understanding that the Protectionists would implement a number of social reforms desired by Labour. Labour's program, however, was frequently too radical for many Protectionists, creating internal conflict between those who, like H. B. Higgins, were sympathetic to Labour, while conservatives like Allan McLean preferred to support the Free Trade Party.

On 25 August 1903 legislation to set up the High Court of Australia consisting of three judges was finally passed. Barton resigned his party leadership position on 24 September 1903 to be replaced by Deakin who then formed the first Deakin government. Then, on 5 October 1903, Deakin appointed Barton, as well as the party's Senate leader, Richard O'Connor, to be justices of the High Court, before calling the 1903 federal election for December and going into caretaker government mode. At the election, the number of seats won by the Protectionists declined to 26 while Labour's increased to 22, but Labour continued its policy of supporting a minority Deakin Protectionist government.

After a falling out in April 1904 between Labour's Watson and Deakin, Deakin resigned office. Free Trade leader George Reid declined to take office, leaving Watson and Labour to form its first minority government, which lasted for four months. In August 1904, Reid was able to form a Free Trade government with Protectionist support. Reid's government lasted until 5 July 1905, when the Protectionists and Labour reconciled, and the previous arrangement was restored, with the formation of the second Deakin government. On 12 October 1906, the size of the High Court was increased to 5 justices, and Deakin appointed prominent Protectionists Higgins and Isaac Isaacs to the High Court to get them out of politics, but they were qualified for the judicial position, as they had been lawyers. Higgins was Attorney-General in the Labour government of 1904 (Labour did not have a lawyer to appoint), and Isaacs was Attorney-General in 1905 in the Deakin government. The Free Trade Party recognised that the issue of tariffs had been settled and that the main issue was the Labour resurgence. Before the 1906 federal election, held in December, it changed its name to the Anti-Socialist Party. At the election, the Protectionists, whose protectionist policies were by then redundant, won only 16 seats to Labour's 26, but Labour still led by Watson continued to support Deakin who formed the well known third Deakin Protectionist government.

Labour now under Andrew Fisher withdrew its support of the Deakin government on 13 November 1908 and formed a minority government. The Fisher government passed a large number of its legislation. A scandalised establishment, believing an anti-socialist alliance was necessary to counter Labor's growing electoral dominance, pressured Deakin and Anti-Socialist Party's new leader, Joseph Cook, to begin merger talks. The more liberal Protectionists opposed a merger. The party wound up splitting as a result. The main body, including Deakin and his supporters, merged with the Anti-Socialist Party in May 1909 to become the Commonwealth Liberal Party (CLP), popularly known as "the Fusion Party", with Deakin as leader and Cook as deputy leader. The more liberal Protectionists defected to Labour. Deakin and the new CLP now held a majority on the floor of the House of Representatives and the Fisher government fell in a vote on 27 May 1909. Fisher failed to persuade the Governor-General Lord Dudley to dissolve Parliament. The Deakin CLP government was in power for less than a year until the 1910 election, where Labour under Fisher formed Australia's first elected federal majority government, and the first elected Senate majority, winning 42 of the 75 seats in the House of Representatives to the Liberal's 31. Deakin retired from Parliament in April 1913 and Cook took over the Liberal leadership before the calling of the 1913 election. The Liberals under Cook won government in 1913 by a single seat, however, Labor retained a Senate majority. Cook called a double dissolution, the first time one would be called. When the Senate rejected a bill twice, Cook called the 1914 election. The election had been called before the declaration of war in August 1914, and the campaign was conducted with the caretaker government going onto a war footing. At the election, the Liberals were soundly defeated with another Labor majority in both houses.

While the party itself disappeared into history, many of its key legislative initiatives, such as the White Australia policy and tariff protection for industry, were maintained by successive Australian governments for a large part of the 20th century. However, Labor could also take credit or be blamed (as the case may be) as many of the bills were passed during the Protectionist-Labour minority governments as part of Labour's agreement for supporting a Protectionist government.

Electoral results

Parliament of Australia

See also 
 1901 Australian federal election
 1887 New South Wales colonial election
 Australian Protectionist Party

References

External links 

 Australian Dictionary of Biography - Edmund Barton
 Australian Dictionary of Biography - Alfred Deakin

Liberal parties in Australia
Defunct political parties in Australia
Political parties established in 1887
Political parties disestablished in 1909
1909 disestablishments in Australia
Protectionism
1887 establishments in Australia